Louis Vinson Franklin Sr. (born 1958) is an American lawyer who served as the United States Attorney for the Middle District of Alabama from 2017 to 2021.

Education and legal career
Franklin received his Bachelor of Arts from the University of Alabama in 1981, his Master of Science from Auburn University at Montgomery in 1983, and his Juris Doctor from Howard University School of Law in 1987. He was a staff attorney at Legal Services Corporation from 1987 to 1990. Franklin was an Assistant United States Attorney from 1990 to 1996 and from 1998 to 2001. From 1996 to 1998, he was an associate at Sirote and Permutt. Franklin has been employed by the United States Attorney's Office for the Middle District of Alabama for nearly 27 years, including as criminal chief for nearly 16 years.

United States Attorney
In June 2017, Franklin was nominated by President Donald Trump to become the United States Attorney for the Middle District of Alabama.
He was confirmed by voice vote on September 14, 2017. On February 8, 2021, he along with 55 other attorneys were asked to resign. Frankln retired on February 26, 2021.

References

1958 births
Living people
African-American lawyers
Alabama lawyers
Assistant United States Attorneys
Auburn University at Montgomery alumni
Howard University School of Law alumni
Lawyers from Montgomery, Alabama
University of Alabama alumni
United States Attorneys for the Middle District of Alabama
21st-century American lawyers
21st-century African-American people
20th-century African-American people